Milton Morris served two terms in the Louisiana House of Representatives during the Reconstruction era from 1868 until 1872 representing Ascension Parish. He was a former slave.

He was originally from Missouri and lived there before the American Civil War. He married and had three children. After his wife died he married again and had another child.

He was re-elected to the Louisiana House. He was among the men appointed by the Louisiana Senate to leadership of the Morning Star Benevolent Association, an agency established to manage burials in Ascension. He and J. E. Warren were also authorized to operate a ferry service across the river to and from Donaldsonville.

See also
List of African-American officeholders during Reconstruction

References

People from Missouri
People from Ascension Parish, Louisiana
People from Donaldsonville, Louisiana
African-American politicians during the Reconstruction Era
American former slaves
19th-century American politicians
Year of birth missing
Year of death missing
African-American state legislators in Louisiana
Members of the Louisiana House of Representatives